Maarrat Misrin Subdistrict  is a Syrian nahiyah (subdistrict) located in Idlib District in Idlib.  According to the Syria Central Bureau of Statistics (CBS), Maarrat Misrin Subdistrict had a population of 57,859 in the 2004 census.

References 

Subdistricts of Idlib Governorate